"Talking About" is a song by English singer-songwriter Conor Maynard. The song was released in the United Kingdom as a digital download on 2 March 2015 through Parlophone. The song has peaked at number 44 on the UK Singles Chart.

Music video
A music video to accompany the release of "Talking About" was first released onto YouTube on 1 March 2015 at a total length of three minutes and twenty-two seconds.

Track listing

Chart performance

Weekly charts

Release history

References

2015 singles
2015 songs
Conor Maynard songs
Parlophone singles
Songs written by Jonny Coffer